Bosnia and Herzegovina competed at the 1993 World Championships in Athletics from 13 – 22 August 1993.

Results

Women
Track and road events

See also
 Bosnia and Herzegovina at the World Championships in Athletics

References

Nations at the 1993 World Championships in Athletics
World Championships in Athletics
1993